Nikola Dimitrov Obreshkov (March 6, 1896 in VarnaAugust 11, 1963 in Sofia) was a prominent Bulgarian mathematician, working in complex analysis.

See also
Obreschkoff–Ostrowski theorem

References
 European Mathematics Society Newsletter No. 51 (PDF), page 28.

Nikola Obrechkoff

Bulgarian mathematicians
1896 births
1963 deaths
Members of the Bulgarian Academy of Sciences
People from Varna, Bulgaria